Uqturpan County or Uchturpan County (transliterated from), also Wushi County, is a county in the Xinjiang Uyghur Autonomous Region under the administration of Aksu Prefecture and shares an approximately  long border with Kyrgyzstan's Issyk-Kul Region. The county is bordered to the northeast by Onsu County (Wensu), to the southeast by Aksu city, to the west by Akqi County in Kizilsu Kyrgyz Autonomous Prefecture and to the south by Kalpin County (Keping).

Name
Uqturpan is also spelled Uchturpan and Uch-Turfan.

History

Tang
During the Battle of Aksu (717), the Umayyad Caliphate and their Turgesh and Tibetan Empire allies hope to seize Uqturpan (then known as Dai-dʑiᴇk-dʑiᴇŋ) from Tang-Karluks-Exiled Western Turkic Khaganate allies but were repelled.

Qing

Ush Turfan  was the site of a battle between Barhanuddin and Abdulla during the Revolt of the Altishahr Khojas. Six years after the Revolt of the Altishahr Khojas, ten years after the Qing's rescue of the Khoja Brothers from Dzungars, an anti-Qing uprising of the local Turkic (later "Uyghur") people took place in Uqturpan. Legend says that a local rebel leader was married to Iparhan, known as the "Fragrant Concubine" a descendant of Apaq Khoja. During the turmoil, many fled, and the thousands who remained were killed by Sino-Manchu forces. Later, the area was repopulated by migrants from what is now Southern Xinjiang.

The Ush rebellion in 1765 by Uyghurs against the Manchus occurred after Uyghur women were gang raped by the servants and son of Manchu official Su-cheng. It was said that Ush Muslims had long wanted to sleep on [Sucheng and son's] hides and eat their flesh. because of the rape of Uyghur Muslim women for months by the Manchu official Sucheng and his son. The Manchu Emperor ordered that the Uyghur rebel town be massacred, the Qing forces enslaved all the Uyghur children and women and slaughtered the Uyghur men. Manchu soldiers and Manchu officials regularly having sex with or raping Uyghur women caused massive hatred and anger by Uyghur Muslims to Manchu rule.

21st century

In 2012, Aqyar Township (Aheya) was made a town.

In a 2012 article from Radio Free Asia, it was reported that according to family sources and local authorities, Islam Urayim, then 32, a native of Uqturpan County who had been deported to China on December 19, 2009, despite seeking asylum in Cambodia, had been sentenced to life in prison. It was unclear when Urayim was sentenced or on what charges he was convicted.

On April 3, 2015, Imam Township (Yimamu) was made a town.

On October 27, 2019, at 1:29 PM, a 5.0-magnitude earthquake hit Uqturpan County. No casualties were reported.

According to a 2020 Radio Free Asia report, it was estimated by local officials that 20,000 Uyghurs were detained in the three re-education camps in the county.

Geography

59.9% of the territory of Uqturpan County is mountainous, 27.6% is Gobi-like desert areas and 12.5% is valley flatland.

Administrative divisions
Towns (بازىرى / 镇):
Uqturpan Town (Uchturpan, Wushi; ئۇچتۇرپان بازىرى / 乌什镇), Aqyar (Aheya, Akyar;  / , formerly 阿合雅乡), Imam (Yimamu, Imamlirim; ئىمام بازىرى / , formerly 依麻木乡)

Townships ( / ):
Aqtoqay Township (Aketuohai;  / ), Achatagh Township (Aqiatage;  / ), Yakowruk Township (Yakeruike, Yakowrük;  / ), Yengiawat Township (Ying'awati; يېڭىئاۋات يېزىسى / ), Otbeshi Township (Aotebeixi;  / ), Yamansu Kyrgyz Ethnic Township (يامانسۇ قىرغىز يېزىسى / 亚曼苏柯尔克孜族乡)

Climate

Demographics 

As of 2015, 216,579 of the 235,336 residents of the county were Uyghur, 11,462 were Han Chinese, 5,613 were Kyrgyz and 1,682 were from other ethnic groups.

As of 1999, 90.01% of the population of Uqturpan (Wushi) County was Uyghur and 6.73% of the population was Han Chinese.

Economy
Uqturpan County's economy is primarily based on agriculture and animal husbandry, producing wheat, rice, corn, cotton, sesame, rapeseed, and pelts. Industries include cooking oil processing, tractor repair, and construction among others.

, there was about 86,800 acres (572,793 mu) of cultivated land in Uqturpan.

Historical maps
Historical English-language maps including Uqturpan:

Notes

References

County-level divisions of Xinjiang
Populated places along the Silk Road
Aksu Prefecture